The 1951 South American Rugby Championship was the first edition of the two tiered competition of the leading national Rugby Union teams in South America.

The tournament was arranged by the "River Plate Rugby Union" (currently "Argentine Rugby Union"). In February 1951 a match was organized in Buenos Aires, the first edition of Pan American Games, but it was not possible to arrange a tournament of rugby for those games, so a "Torneo Internacional" was arranged in September.  Initially this competition was called Torneo Internacional ABCU using the initials of the countries participating 

After the 1958 edition, this tournament was recognized as the first edition of the competition.

Standings 

{| class="wikitable"
|-
!width=165|Team
!width=40|Played
!width=40|Won
!width=40|Drawn
!width=40|Lost
!width=40|For
!width=40|Against
!width=40|Difference
!width=40|Pts
|- bgcolor=#ccffcc align=center
|align=left| 
|3||3||0||0||147||3||+144||6
|- align=center
|align=left| 
|3||2||0||1||25||75||−50||4
|- align=center
|align=left| 
|3||1||0||2||74||21||+53||2
|- align=center
|align=left| 
|3||0||0||3||10||157||−147||0
|}

Results 
Complete list of matches:

References

External links 
   Mazlenaz - Championnats d'Amérique du Sud 
  ESPN Scrum - South American Championship 1951 / Results 

1951
1951 rugby union tournaments for national teams
rugby union
rugby union
rugby union
rugby union
1951
International rugby union competitions hosted by Argentina